St. Anthony is a city in Marshall County, Iowa, United States. The population was 76 at the time of the 2020 census.

History
St. Anthony was incorporated in 1897 and it was named by two of its founders, John Q. Saint and Anthony R. Pierce.

Geography
St. Anthony is located at  (42.124164, -93.196667).

Demographics

2010 census
As of the census of 2010, there were 102 people, 40 households, and 27 families living in the city. The racial makeup of the city was 92.2% White, 1.0% African American, 2.9% Native American, 1.0% Asian, and 2.9% from two or more races. Hispanic or Latino of any race were 5.9% of the population.

There were 40 households, of which 37.5% had children under the age of 18 living with them, 40.0% were married couples living together, 15.0% had a female householder with no husband present, 12.5% had a male householder with no wife present, and 32.5% were non-families. 25.0% of all households were made up of individuals, and 5% had someone living alone who was 65 years of age or older. The average household size was 2.55 and the average family size was 3.00.

The median age in the city was 35 years. 28.4% of residents were under the age of 18; 4% were between the ages of 18 and 24; 27.4% were from 25 to 44; 33.3% were from 45 to 64; and 6.9% were 65 years of age or older. The gender makeup of the city was 53.9% male and 46.1% female.

2000 census
As of the census of 2000, there were 109 people, 44 households, and 28 families living in the city. The racial makeup of the city was 96.33% White, 0.92% Native American, 0.92% from other races, and 1.83% from two or more races. Hispanic or Latino of any race were 0.92% of the population.

There were 44 households, out of which 29.5% had children under the age of 18 living with them, 50.0% were married couples living together, 11.4% had a female householder with no husband present, and 34.1% were non-families. 25.0% of all households were made up of individuals, and 6.8% had someone living alone who was 65 years of age or older. The average household size was 2.48 and the average family size was 2.90.

In the city, the population was spread out, with 24.8% under the age of 18, 11.0% from 18 to 24, 35.8% from 25 to 44, 15.6% from 45 to 64, and 12.8% who were 65 years of age or older. The median age was 34 years. For every 100 females, there were 84.7 males. For every 100 females age 18 and over, there were 100.0 males.

The median income for a household in the city was $30,625, and the median income for a family was $37,500. Males had a median income of $26,875 versus $19,375 for females. The per capita income for the city was $15,218. There were 7.9% of families and 13.1% of the population living below the poverty line, including 15.4% of under eighteens and 5.3% of those over 64.

References

Cities in Marshall County, Iowa
Cities in Iowa